John Garvin "Garry" Hoyt (born 7 April 1931) is a Puerto Rican sailor. He competed at the 1968 Summer Olympics, the 1972 Summer Olympics and the 1976 Summer Olympics. He was also bronze medallist at the 1965 Snipe World Championship.

References

External links
 

1931 births
Living people
Puerto Rican male sailors (sport)
Olympic sailors of Puerto Rico
Sailors at the 1968 Summer Olympics – Finn
Sailors at the 1972 Summer Olympics – Tempest
Sailors at the 1976 Summer Olympics – Tempest
Snipe class sailors
Place of birth missing (living people)
20th-century Puerto Rican people